Viksjö is a district of Järfälla Municipality, Stockholm County, Sweden, in Stockholm.

Viksjö has 15,000 inhabitants. The district was developed in the 1970s. The architecture consists mainly of detached terraced houses.

Viksjö is named after the old farm Viksjö Gård, which dates back to 1734. The name Viksjö is even older, occurring for the first time on an 11th-century rune-stone.

Attractions 
 The nature reserve Görväln by Lake Mälaren
 Görväln House
 Görväln Beach
 Viksjö Golf Course
 Bruket Alpine Skiing
 Viksjö Church
 Gåseborg

Areas 
 Högby
 Sandvik
 Andeboda
 Hummelmora

Communication 
 Commuter train to Jakobsberg and then feeder bus.
 Motorway (E18) from Stockholm.
 Approximate location: 59° 24' N, 17° 46' E

Gallery

References

External links 
  Järfälla Municipality - official site

Stockholm urban area